The People's Socialist Party, Nepal (abbr. PSP-N), also known as Janata Samajbadi Party  is the sixth-largest political party in Nepal. Since the 2022 local election, the party has been limited to stand only as the third largest party of Madhesh Province after the Nepali Congress and CPN (UML) respectively. Recently the party faced multiple splits under Mahantha Thakur, Baburam Bhattarai, Mahendra Ray Yadav and Resham Lal Chaudhary.

With 12 out of 275 seats in the lower house House of Representative and 3 out of 59 seats in the upper house National Assembly, the party is the fifth-largest and one of the most powerful bargaining political parties in the Federal Parliament, after CPN (UML), the Nepali Congress, CPN (Maoist Centre) and CPN (Unified Socialist).

History

Formation of PSP-N 
The Rastriya Janata Party Nepal and Samajbadi Party, Nepal were in constant negotiations throughout 2019 with talks failing or being in limbo because of issues relating to power sharing and Samajbadi Party, Nepal not withdrawing support from the K.P. Oli led government.

Samajbadi Party finally quit the government in late on 24 December 2019 after the Prime minister rejected the party's proposals on constitution amendments while demoting Yadav from the post of Health Minister. The failure to quit the government despite repeated calls before had put a deadlock on the negotiations between the two parties. Hopes of unification suffered a further blow when RJPN announced an electoral alliance with the ruling Nepal Communist Party for the 2020 National Assembly elections while the Samajbadi Party, Nepal announced electoral alliance with Nepali Congress. Negotiations for unification still continued through early 2020 with issues relating to power sharing and leadership still becoming a major sticking point for both parties rather than ideology.

As per trusted sources and national media's, Renu Yadav wanted to split the party with seven other MPs which included Bimal Prasad Shrivastav, Surendra Kumar Yadav, Mohammad Estiyak Rai, Pradeep Yadav, Umashankar Argariya, Kalu Devi Bishwakarma and Renuka Gurung. Though the plan went unsuccess do to last moment merger of Samajbadi Party, Nepal and Rastriya Janata Party Nepal to form People's Socialist Party, Nepal it was highly covered by national medias.

The deadlock finally broke on 23 April 2020 after this incident and the two parties finally reached an agreement for a merger just two days after the government issued an ordinance that amended the Political Party Act which made it possible for a party to split if supported by 40% of either the party's central committee or its parliamentarians, The new party, People's Socialist Party, Nepal was officially registered with the Election Commission on 9 July 2020.

It was formed by the merger of the two parties in Nepal, the Samajbadi Party, Nepal, led by  Baburam Bhattarai and Upendra Yadav, and the Rastriya Janata Party Nepal, led by the presidium of Mahantha Thakur and five others.

First local elections 
The party faces a major setback in the 2022 Nepalese local elections when it had to lose majority of places it contested. The party had to lose Hanumannagar Kankalini municipality and Balan Bihul rural municipality to newly formed Janamat Party led by CK Raut. Among these, son of provincial minister Nawal Kishor Sah Sudi lost as mayor in Hanumannagar Kankalini.

Party's leader and chief minister Lalbabu Raut lost his own home town, Jagarnathpur Rural Municipality to Nepali Congress. Even his wife Jalekha Khatun lost as deputy chairperson candidate. Similarly, the party lost its security deposits in various local levels of Madhesh Province and all over Nepal which it had contested for not attaining even 10% vote. Party's candidate for mayor in Janakpur, Lal kishor Sah could attain only fifth position and lost to Nepali Congress leader Manoj Kumar Sah. As a result, Nepali Congress stood as single largest party in Madhesh Province. As a result, the party was limited to become only the third largest party of Madhesh province being able to win just 28 local levels in province compared to 45 which it had before elections. This was seen as an effect of split in party forming Loktantrik Samajwadi Party and the rise of Janamat Party, Terai Madhesh Loktantrik Party in eastern terai while Janata Pragatisheel Party and Nagrik Unmukti Party in western terai of Nepal.

First general election 
The party had to bear a huge loss all over Nepal. Party's Chairman Upendra Yadav lost his seat Saptari 2 to CK Raut of Janamat Party. Similarly the party was limited to 4 of 32 seats in Madhesh Province.

Disputes and splits

Major splits

First split 

After the dissolution of parliament, the party got divided into two faction within one year of formation. The party got formally divided into two by 27 July 2021. Mahantha Thakur registered a new party under the name Loktantrik Samajwadi Party, Nepal with 16 among 51 central working committee members and fifteen MPs. Senior leaders like Sharat Singh Bhandari, Anil Kumar Jha, Umashankar Argariya Yadav, Rajendra Mahato, etc. joined president Thakur's party. As many as 17 MLAs and local level heads joined the party changing the status of single party majority government in Madhesh Province to majority collision.

Second split  

There occurred third split with 10 out of 33 central committee members in Bhattarai faction, 17 with Upendra-Ashok faction and 5 neutral as of 15 July 2021.

The third split occurred when politicians including Baburam Bhattarai, Mahendra Raya Yadav, Rajkishor Yadav and Ashok Rai stood against the authoritarian and power centric nature of Upendra Yadav. Majority of their demands were neglected. As a result, both the factions conducted central meeting on last week of Ashad.

Later leaders including Ashok Rai, Estiyak Rai, Mrigendra Singh Yadav and Pradeep Yadav switched faction to Upendra Yadav for getting minister post in government. As a result, though both the faction were unable to get majority, Upendra faction removed Baburam Bhattarai and 9 other central working committee members from party in presence of 17 out of 33 central working committee members. This included Hisila Yami, Mahendra Raya Yadav, Ganga Narayan Shrestha, Bhakta Bahadur Shah, Prashant Singh, Damber Khatiwada, Dan Bahadur Chaudhary, Durga Sob and Ramesh Yadav. Later senior leader Renu Yadav resigned from the party on the same day. On the other hand, Nabaraj Subedi a central committee member of Bhattrai faction went to Saudi Arabia as ambassador. Similarly, Ashok Rai was nominated as federal council president by Upendra Yadav faction for leaving Bhattari faction. As a result, only 17 of 53 central working committee members during party formation were left in the party.

Minor splits

Under Resham Lal Chaudhary

The second split occurred in December 2021 when influential Tharu leader Resham Lal Chaudhary formed Nagrik Unmukti Party. He created the party citing that the party had been power oriented forgetting the mandate that the party had received. This was the second split to the party since its formation creating a huge quake in the party organization mainly in Sudurpaschim province and Tharu vote Bank of the party.

Minor defections 
During local election 2019

Various leaders left the party to join major political parties while they couldn't join Nepali Congress as a result they joined mainly CPN (UML). Party leader and mayor of Birgunj Metropolitan city, left the party. In his statement he told there was no use of small parties in nation development. He accepted that his first choice was to join but due to some technical reasons he couldn't join the Nepali Congress  party and he joined CPN (UML). On the same day, chairman of Adarsha Kotwal Rural Municipality of Bara, Mustufa Ansari left the party joining CPN (UML).

During general election 2022 
Various leader of left the party to join either CPN (UML) or Nepali Congress amidst the 2022 Nepalese general election due to decreased party hold in their regions. Party senior deputy chairman Shesh Narayan Yadav led team joined Nepali Congress. Similarly, party's provincial party chairman and Physical Infrastructure minister of Lumbini province Sahas Ram Yadav joined Nepali Congress. Later lone MLA of PSP-N in Bagmati Province, Prem Tamang joined Nepali Congress followed by HOR MP Chanda Chaudhary. A group led by former MP Amrita Agrahari and Ruhi Naaj joined CPN (UML). On the other hand, former MP and minister Renuka Gurung joined Rastriya Prajatantra Party.

List of breakaway parties

Disputes

MCC compact 
A faction of the party led by Upendra Yadav told that it had no opinion on the matter. It would support CPN (Unified Socialist) and CPN (Maoist Centre) without making its own approach.

Party's other faction led by Baburam Bhattarai stood in support of the project. Leaders including Raj Kishor Yadav stood in support of rectifying the compact. Chairman Bhattarai said that having dual approach on the topic was wrong. He requested parties including the CPN (Maoist Centre) to stay out of the government rather than having dual approach on the topic. This dual nature of CPN (Maoist Centre) and CPN (Unified Socialist) was also criticized by national medias. This made the cracks more clear in the party.

Ideology 
The party advocates for identity based federalism and a more inclusive parliament. They also support a more decentralized government structure which guarantee of more power to provincial and local governments. The party intends to implement the agreements of the Nepalese Civil War, Madheshi movement and various other movements.

Electoral performance

General election

Provincial election

Local election

Leadership

Federal council chairmen 

 Baburam Bhattarai 2020–2022

Executive chairmen 
 Mahantha Thakur 2020–2021
Upendra Yadav   2020–present

Chief Ministers

Madhesh Province

List of Members of Parliament 

List of Pratinidhi Sabha members from People's Socialist Party

See also 

 2021 split in the People's Socialist Party, Nepal
 Loktantrik Samajwadi Party, Nepal 
 2022 Provincial Assembly of Madhesh Province election

Notes

References

Democratic socialist parties in Asia
Federalist parties in Nepal
Political parties established in 2020
2020 establishments in Nepal
Socialist parties in Nepal